The serpentine system (also called snake seeding) is a method employed in the organization of a competition to define the seeded teams and arrange them in pools. The n ranked teams that will be involved in the tournament are distributed in m pools according to the following algorithm:

For instance, 12 teams would be organized in four-team pools, according to the serpentine   system, as follows:

To improve competitivity, this method is sometimes used in conjunction with the drawing of lots method: the serpentine system is used only for some of the teams involved in a competition ("seeds"); the rest are distributed in pools following a drawing of lots.

Sports terminology